Leucadendron daphnoides, the Du Toit's Kloof conebush, is a flower-bearing shrub in to the genus Leucadendron and forms part of the fynbos. The plant is native to the Western Cape and occurs in the Slanghoek, Du Toits, and Stettynskloof mountains. The shrub grows up to 1.5 m tall and flowers from July to September.

References 

 Du Toit's Kloof Conebush – Red List of South African Plants
 Leucadendron daphnoides – biodiversity explorer
 Sun Conebushes, Leucadendrons – Protea Atlas

daphnoides